Hydraulics International, Inc., known as HII headquartered in Chatsworth, California, U.S., is a supplier of  defense products, services and support to military forces, aviation and commercial industries, Government agencies and prime contractors. The company develops manufactures and supports systems for over one hundred industries as well as mission critical and military sustainment requirements.

HII manufactures defense ground support equipment including ammunition loading systems, aircraft hydraulic system testing, aircraft cabin pressure testing, power systems, environmental control systems, military trailers, high pressure gas and liquid systems, flow measuring equipment, and logistics and support services.

The company was established in 1976.

References

External links
 Hydraulics International, INC. Website.

Manufacturing companies established in 1976
Manufacturing companies based in Los Angeles
San Fernando Valley
Aviation ground support equipment companies
1976 establishments in California